The 1909 Dickinson Red and White football team was an American football team that represented Dickinson College as an independent during the 1909 college football season. The team compiled a 4–4–1 record and was outscored by a total of 85 to 77. Paul G. Smith was the head coach.

Schedule

}}

References

Dickinson
Dickinson Red Devils football seasons
Dickinson Red and White football